Toseong Station is a station of Busan Metro Line 1 in Toseong-dong, Seo District, Busan, South Korea. The station opened in 1988 as Toseongdong Station (토성동역) but was changed to its current name in 2010.

External links

  Cyber station information from Busan Transportation Corporation

Busan Metro stations
Seo District, Busan
Railway stations opened in 1988
1988 establishments in South Korea
20th-century architecture in South Korea